Elaphoglossoideae is a subfamily of the fern family Dryopteridaceae. It has previously been regarded as the family Elaphoglossaceae. As circumscribed by the Pteridophyte Phylogeny Group in their 2016 classification (PPG I), the subfamily excludes the Polybotryoideae, which are kept separate. It can be divided into three clades: the bolbitidoid ferns (Arthrobotrya, Bolbitis, Elaphoglossum, Lomagramma, Mickelia, Teratophyllum), genus Pleocnemia, sister clade to the bolbititoids, and the lastreopsid ferns (Lastreopsis, Megalastrum, Parapolystichum, Ruhmora), sister to the combination of the first two clades.

References

Dryopteridaceae
Plant subfamilies